Boone v Eyre (1777) 1 H Bl 273 is an English contract law case concerned with substantial performance and conditions precedent.

Facts
The plaintiff sued the defendant for not paying a £160 annuity (for life) for a plantation in the West Indies that came with a group of slaves, after an initial payment of £500. The defendant contended that when the plaintiff made the deed, the plaintiff did not lawfully possess the slaves, and therefore had no good title. Therefore, the defendant was arguing he had the right to terminate the agreement and cease performance.

Judgment
Lord Mansfield said the following:

See also

English contract law

References

English contract case law
Slavery case law